The Re:SET Concert Series is a traveling series of outdoor concerts in the United States, launched in 2023. The inaugural edition will be headlined by LCD Soundsystem, boygenius, and Steve Lacy.

History
On January 31, 2023, AEG (Anschutz Entertainment Group) Presents announced the inaugural Re:SET Concert Series. Along with the announcement, it was revealed that each headliner curated the lineup specific to their headlining days. The groups will rotate between three cities in a surrounding area before moving to the next group of cities. The groups will share one stage, receiving headlining set times, and no sets will conflict.

2023 Lineup

LCD Soundsystem
 Jamie xx
 Idles
 L'Rain (partial dates)
 Big Freedia (partial dates)boygenius Clairo
 Dijon
 Bartees StrangeSteve Lacy James Blake
 Toro Y Moi
 Fousheé

Tour datesLCD SoundsystemboygeniusSteve Lacy'''

References

2023 concert tours